Dimethylethanolamine (DMAE or DMEA) is an organic compound with the formula . It is bifunctional, containing both a tertiary amine and primary alcohol functional groups. It is a colorless viscous liquid. It is used in skin care products for improving skin tone and 
also taken orally as a nootropic.  It is prepared by the ethoxylation of dimethylamine.

Industrial uses

Dimethylaminoethanol is used as a curing agent for polyurethanes and epoxy resins. It is a precursor to other chemicals, such as the nitrogen mustard 2-dimethylaminoethyl chloride.  The acrylate ester is used as a flocculating agent.

Related compounds are used in gas purification, e.g. removal of hydrogen sulfide from sour gas streams.

Nutraceutical uses
The bitartrate salt of DMAE, i.e. N,N-dimethylethanolamine bitartrate, is sold as a dietary supplement. It is a white powder providing 37% DMAE.

Animal tests show possible benefit for improving spatial memory and working memory.

See also
 Choline
 Diphenhydramine
 Doxylamine
 Ethanolamine
 Meclofenoxate (Centrophenoxine)
 Orphenadrine

References

Dimethylamino compounds
Primary alcohols
Cholinergics
Nootropics
Corrosion inhibitors
Ethanolamines